Teleidae or Teleidai, also appearing as Teleidon (Τηλειδῶν), was a town in ancient Euboea. It was a deme of Eretria. It is located near modern Paralia Oxylithou.

References

Populated places in ancient Euboea
Former populated places in Greece
Ancient Eretria